Mariah Stackhouse (born March 4, 1994) is an American professional golfer on the U.S.-based LPGA Tour. Stackhouse is a graduate of Stanford University, where she was a four-year All-American, and majored in communications. She helped the Cardinal to an NCAA title in 2015. In 2011, at the age of 17, she became the youngest African American woman to earn a spot in the field at the U.S. Open. In 2014, she became the first African American woman to make the Curtis Cup team, which the United States won that year.

Early life and amateur career
Stackhouse is the daughter of Ken Stackhouse, formerly a partner in an architectural firm, and Sharon Stackhouse, a hospital administrator.

When Stackhouse was a 2-year old, her father cut down a set of golf clubs for her. "I began to practice alongside him, and he never stopped taking me. I guess I developed a liking for the game, I kept practicing, and here I am now," says Stackhouse. She played in her first tournament at age 6 and tied for first.

Stackhouse graduated from North Clayton High School in Riverdale, GA, where she was elected class president two years in a row.

In 2013 as a freshman at Stanford, Stackhouse shot a 61 at the Peg Barnard Invitational Tournament which set an NCAA scoring record. Her round of 61 included a front nine score of 26 (−9).

At the 2015 NCAA Division I Championship, Stackhouse finished 6th in the individual competition and led her team to the team title.

Professional career

2016–Present
Stackhouse qualified for the LPGA Tour by finishing in a tie for 21st at the LPGA Qualifying Tournament to earn Priority List Category 17 status for the 2017 LPGA season. In making her professional debut in the Portland Classic in June 2016, she became the seventh African American woman to earn a LPGA Tour card.

In the 2018 ShopRite LPGA Classic, Stackhouse finished in 7th place, her best showing at that point in her professional career. On June 9, 2019 she started in the final group at the ShopRite LPGA Classic and finished tied for 5th, a career best.

Results in LPGA majors
Results not in chronological order before 2019.

^ The Evian Championship was added as a major in 2013 

LA = Low amateur
CUT = missed the half-way cut
NT = no tournament
T = tied

Summary

LPGA Tour career summary

* Includes matchplay and other tournaments without a cut.
 official through the 2022 season

World ranking
Position in Women's World Golf Rankings at the end of each calendar year.

Team appearances
Amateur
Curtis Cup (representing the United States): 2014 (winners)
Junior Solheim Cup (representing the United States): 2011 (winners)

References

External links

American female golfers
Stanford Cardinal women's golfers
LPGA Tour golfers
African-American golfers
Golfers from Charlotte, North Carolina
1994 births
Living people
21st-century African-American women